Dori, Dharwad is a village in Dharwad district of Karnataka, India.

Demographics 
As of the 2011 Census of India there were 308 households in Dori and a total population of 1,523 consisting of 754 males and 769 females. There were 207 children ages 0-6.

References

Villages in Dharwad district